Legends of the Superheroes is an umbrella title for two 60-minute live-action television specials produced by Hanna-Barbera Productions that aired on NBC on January 18 and 25, 1979. The series was loosely based on Hanna-Barbera's Super Friends animated series, then airing on Saturday mornings on ABC; it served as a reunion of sorts for the 1960s' Batman TV series, as it brings back together three of its stars reprising their respective roles. The specials were produced like standard variety shows of the time: on videotape and with a laugh track.

Cast
Legends of the Superheroes starred Adam West and Burt Ward, reprising their roles as Batman and Robin. The show also had a large ensemble cast of other DC Comics superheroes that included Garrett Craig as Captain Marvel, Howard Murphy as the Green Lantern, Rod Haase as The Flash, Bill Nuckols as Hawkman, Barbara Joyce as The Huntress, Alfie Wise as The Atom and Danuta Wesley (credited as Danuta) as the Black Canary.

Cast list
Adam West as Batman (both specials)
Burt Ward as Robin (both specials)
William Schallert as Retired Man/Scarlet Cyclone (both specials)
Mickey Morton as Solomon Grundy (both specials)
Jeff Altman as Weather Wizard (both specials)
Charlie Callas as Sinestro (both specials)
Howard Murphy as Green Lantern (both specials)
Aleshia Brevard as Giganta (both specials)
Garrett Craig as Captain Marvel (both specials)
Howard Morris as Dr. Sivana (both specials)
Danuta Wesley as Black Canary (both specials)
Bill Nuckols as Hawkman (both specials)
Rod Haase as The Flash (both specials)
Gabriel Dell as Mordru (both specials)
Barbara Joyce as Huntress (both specials)
Frank Gorshin as The Riddler (1st special)
Ruth Buzzi as Aunt Minerva (2nd special)
Ed McMahon as Himself (2nd special)
Alfie Wise as The Atom (2nd special)
June Gable as Rhoda Rooter (2nd special)
Pat Carroll as Hawkman's Mother (2nd special)
Brad Sanders as Ghetto Man (2nd special)
Gary Owens as Narrator (uncredited, both specials)
Marsha Warfield as Woman in phone booth (uncredited, 1st special)

Notable guest stars
Notable guest stars in the two specials included Frank Gorshin reprising his role as The Riddler from Batman, Howard Morris as Doctor Sivana, Gabriel Dell as Mordru, Charlie Callas as Sinestro, Jeff Altman as the Weather Wizard, Ruth Buzzi as Aunt Minerva, June Gable as Rhoda Rooter, Pat Carroll as Hawkman's mother, Aleshia Brevard as Giganta, William Schallert playing the Scarlet Cyclone (more commonly referred to as "Retired Man") and Brad Sanders as "Ghetto Man". Ed McMahon played himself, hosting the celebrity super-hero roast.

Episodes
Both specials preempted Project U.F.O.

The Challenge
In the first episode, the Justice League of America (Batman, Robin, Flash, Green Lantern, Hawkman, Captain Marvel, Huntress and Black Canary) unite at the Hall of Heroes to celebrate elderly retired superhero Scarlet Cyclone's birthday. The party is interrupted by the Legion of Doom (Riddler, Weather Wizard, Sinestro, Mordru, Doctor Sivana, Giganta and Solomon Grundy), who announce they have hidden a deadly bomb in a secret location, and the heroes must follow clues to find it. It's all actually a ruse to trick the heroes into drinking Dr. Sivana's de-powering potion. Despite the fact that they now lack their super-powers, the heroes fight the villains, and manage to both disarm the bomb and recover their powers. Only after the whole battle is over, and the heroes have proven victorious, does Scarlet Cyclone arrive to give his aid.

The Roast
The second episode was a celebrity roast of the superheroes hosted by Ed McMahon. All of the major characters from the first episode return. New characters featured include Ghetto Man, an African-American superhero who performs a stand-up comedy routine; Aunt Minerva, the Captain Marvel villainess who seeks a sixth husband from among the male superheroes; Rhoda Rooter, an entertainment reporter who snags an exclusive interview with Giganta and the Atom (Alfie Wise) on their engagement to be married; and Esther Hol, Hawkman's mother.

Home media
Warner Home Video's Warner Archive Collection released the specials on DVD on October 19, 2010.

In popular culture
In the Batman: The Brave and the Bold episode "Crisis: 22,300 Miles Above Earth!", Joker, Penguin, Gorilla Grodd, Kite Man, Black Manta, Two-Face, Gentleman Ghost, Mr. Freeze, Riddler, Poison Ivy, Clock King, and Solomon Grundy roast (both figuratively and literally) Batman with help from a kidnapped Jeff Ross.

References

External links
 Legends Of The SuperHeroes Homepage!
 Legends Of The SuperHeroes In Lurid Videotape!
 Information about the series by Comics 101

 Legends Of The SuperHeroes History & Pics at Legions Of Gotham
 Television Obscurities  » Blog Archive   » Legends of the Superheroes
 Legends of the Superheroes Fan Page

1979 American television series debuts
1979 television specials
Batman (TV series)
NBC original programming
1970s American television specials
Hanna-Barbera television specials
Animated television shows based on DC Comics
Television series reunion specials
Justice League television series
Superhero comedy films
American superhero television series